Donald Robertson may refer to:

 Donald Robertson (New Zealand) (1860–1942), Public Service Commissioner in New Zealand
 Donald Robertson (athlete) (1905–1949), Scottish athlete
 Donald Robertson (producer) (born 1973), hip-hop producer and entrepreneur
 Donald Struan Robertson (1885–1961), classical scholar at the University of Cambridge
 Donald Robertson (politician), Canadian politician
 Donald Robertson (artist) (born 1962), artist/illustrator and creative director for Estée Lauder Companies
 Donald Robertson (referee) (born 1987), Scottish football referee
 Donald Robertson (writer) (1930–1995), wrote for Thunderbirds